Erik Salkić (born 10 April 1987) is a retired Slovenian footballer who played as a defender.

Career
Salkić started his senior career at Koper before joining Interblock in the 2006–07 season. He left the club in 2009 after his contract ran out, and signed for Olimpija Ljubljana on a free transfer.

He earned 14 appearances for the Slovenia U21 team between 2006 and 2008.

References

External links
NZS profile 

1987 births
Living people
People from Postojna
Slovenian footballers
Association football fullbacks
FC Koper players
NK IB 1975 Ljubljana players
NK Olimpija Ljubljana (2005) players
FC Arsenal Tula players
NK Tabor Sežana players
Slovenian PrvaLiga players
Slovenian Second League players
Slovenian expatriate footballers
Expatriate footballers in Russia
Expatriate footballers in Italy
Slovenian expatriate sportspeople in Russia
Slovenian expatriate sportspeople in Italy
Slovenia youth international footballers
Slovenia under-21 international footballers